Agios Nikolaos is a traditional quiet village in the south-east of Corfu near to the villages of Petriti and Notos. The village was at one time called Kolokythaki (Κολοκυθάκι, meaning "courgette"). The main industry is agriculture as the land around is flat and the soil is rich despite the main part of the village being situated on a hill. There is a little tourism, mainly people who want to keep clear of large resorts. There are very few old houses in the village; most were built in relatively recently, giving the place a more affluent feel than most Corfiot Villages. The villagers came down from the old village of Korakades following a landslide which washed most of the village away.

References 

Populated places in Corfu (regional unit)